The Southern Cross Stakes, registered as the Frederick Clissold Stakes, is an Australian Turf Club Group 3 Thoroughbred horse race for horses aged three years old and upwards, over a distance of 1200 metres, held at Randwick Racecourse, Sydney, Australia in February. Total prize money for the race is [[A$]200,000.

History
The registered race name is named after Frederick William Clissold, former director and founding member of Canterbury Park Racing Club, who died in 1941, one year after the inaugural running of the race bearing his name.

Name
 1940–1992 -  Frederick Clissold Handicap
 1993 -  Anniversary Cup
 1994 -  Frederick Clissold Handicap
 1995 -  Frederick Clissold Quality
 1996–1998 -  Frederick Clissold Handicap
 1999–2002 -  Frederick Clissold Stakes
 2003 -  Premier Express Freight Stakes
 2004–2008 -  Frederick Clissold Stakes
 2009 onwards -  Southern Cross Stakes

Grade
 1940–1979 - Principal race
 1980–1988 - Listed race
 1989 onwards –  Group 3 race

Distance
 1940–1972 - 6 furlongs (~1200m)
 1975 onwards - 1200 metres

Venue
 1989–1990 - Canterbury Park Racecourse
 1991–1994 - Rosehill Gardens Racecourse
 1995 - Canterbury Park Racecourse 
 1996–2005 - Rosehill Gardens Racecourse
 2006–2011 - Randwick Racecourse
 2012 -  Rosehill Gardens Racecourse
 2013 - Warwick Farm Racecourse
 2014 onwards - Randwick Racecourse

Winners

 2023 - Quantico
 2022 - Lost And Running
 2021 - Masked Crusader
 2020 - Special Reward
 2019 - Eckstein
 2018 - Kaepernick
 2017 - Le Romain
 2016 - Big Money
 2015 - Heart Testa
 2014 - Terravista
 2013 - Skytrain
 2012 - No Evidence Needed
 2011 - Sister Madly
 2010 - Kenny's World
 2009 - Marchinski
 2008 - Hoystar
 2007 - The Free Stater
 2006 - Collate
 2005 - Cool Front
 2004 - Britt’s Best
 2003 - Gordo
 2002 - Lord Essex
 2001 - Ab Initio
 2000 - Pimpala Prince
 1999 - Ab Initio
 1998 - Confiscate
 1997 - Secret Savings
 1996 - Danewin
 1995 - Alert Me
 1994 - Deposition
 1993 - Big Dreams
 1992 - Friend’s Venture
 1991 - Joanne
 1990 - Comrade
 1989 - Diamond Benny
 1988 - Wong
 1987 - Swift Cheval
 1986 - Avon Angel
 1985 - Pete’s Gold
 1984 - Gelsomino
 1983 - Bronze Spirit
 1982 - Ubetido
 1981 - Goreham
 1980 - Brandy Slipper  
 1979 - Scomeld
 1978 - Always Welcome
 1977 - Tiger Town
 1976 - Hartshill
 1975 - Let’s Fly
 1974 - race not held
 1973 - race not held
 1972 - Gunsynd
 1971 - Bogan Rea
 1970 - Biarritz Star
 1969 - Roman Consul
 1968 - Illusionist
 1967 - Red Clinker
 1966 - Aldor
 1965 - Florida Keys
 1964 - Here I Come
 1963 - State Martial
 1962 - Grammar Lad
 1961 - Tipperary Star
 1960 - Dark Night
 1959 - Winchester
 1958 - Jester
 1957 - Juggler
 1956 - Evening Peal
 1955 - My Hali
 1954 - Regoli
 1953 - Nagpuni
 1952 - Osborne
 1951 - Aerofoil
 1950 - San Domenico
 1949 - Cognac
 1948 - Persian Prince
 1947 - Lackaboy
 1946 - Petulance
 1945 - Gay King
 1944 - race not held
 1943 - race not held
 1942 - race not held
 1941 - Amiable
 1940 - Gold Rod

See also
 List of Australian Group races
Group races

External links 
First three placegetters Southern Cross Stakes (ATC)

References

Horse races in Australia